Harold Simpkins (August 16, 1885 – July 11, 1935) was an American golfer. He competed in the men's individual event at the 1904 Summer Olympics.  He graduated from Harvard College.

References

External links
 

American male golfers
Amateur golfers
Olympic golfers of the United States
Golfers at the 1904 Summer Olympics
Harvard Crimson men's golfers
Golfers from St. Louis
1885 births
1935 deaths